Maxie Michael (born 23 June 1951) is a German diver. She competed in the women's 10 metre platform event at the 1972 Summer Olympics.

References

External links
 

1951 births
Living people
German female divers
Olympic divers of West Germany
Divers at the 1972 Summer Olympics
People from Balingen
Sportspeople from Tübingen (region)
20th-century German women